Nothopegia aureo-fulva is a species of plant in the family Anacardiaceae. It is endemic to the Thirunelveli Hills of Tamil Nadu, India.  It is threatened by habitat loss.

References

aureo-fulva
Flora of Tamil Nadu
Critically endangered plants
Taxonomy articles created by Polbot